Tatyana Vladimirovna Nemtsova (born 15 February 1946) is a former figure skater who competed for the Soviet Union. She became a two-time (1960–61) Soviet national champion and competed at four ISU Championships.

Nemtsova began skating in 1952 at the Young Pioneers Stadium in Moscow and later represented DSO Trud Moscow. Her coaches included Tatyana Tolmachova, Lev Mikhaylov, and Petr Orlov.

Competitive highlights

References 

1946 births
Russian female single skaters
Soviet female single skaters
Living people
Figure skaters from Moscow